Great Contemporaries is a collection of  25 short biographical essays about famous people, written by Winston Churchill.

The original collection was published in 1937 and included 21 essays mainly written between 1928 and 1931.  Four were added to the book in the 1939 edition,  about Lord Fisher, Charles Stewart Parnell, Lord Baden-Powell and Franklin D. Roosevelt. In 1941 the essays on Boris Savinkov and Leon Trotsky were removed from editions published at that time, since they had been opponents of Joseph Stalin, who as leader of Russia was now officially an ally of Britain against Germany in World War II, and the article on Roosevelt was removed in 1942 when America also became officially an ally of Britain with Roosevelt as president. The Odhams edition of 1947 reinstated the three essays after the war.

Other subjects of the essays were Earl of Rosebery, Kaiser Wilhelm II, George Bernard Shaw,  Joseph Chamberlain, Sir John French, John Morley, Hindenburg,  H. H. Asquith, Lawrence of Arabia, the Earl of Birkenhead, Marshal Foch, Alfonso XIII, Douglas Haig, Arthur James Balfour,  Adolf Hitler, George Nathaniel Curzon, Philip Snowden, Georges Clemenceau, and  George V.

References
 The Churchill Centre  List of publications by Winston Churchill
 Great Contemporaries (1941) at Internet Archive

Books by Winston Churchill
Books about military history
British non-fiction literature
Baden-Powell Scouts' Association
Paul von Hindenburg
T. E. Lawrence
Georges Clemenceau
George V
Douglas Haig, 1st Earl Haig
Alfonso XIII of Spain
Leon Trotsky
Books about Adolf Hitler
George Bernard Shaw
Wilhelm II, German Emperor
Books about Franklin D. Roosevelt
1937 non-fiction books
Odhams Press books
Books written by prime ministers of the United Kingdom